The 2000 Giro d'Italia was the 83rd edition of the Giro d'Italia, one of cycling's Grand Tours. The Giro began in Rome, with a Prologue individual time trial on 13 May, and Stage 11 occurred on 24 May with an individual time trial from Lignano Sabbiadoro. The race finished in Milan on 4 June.

Stage 11
24 May 2000 — Lignano Sabbiadoro to Bibione,  (ITT)

Rest day
25 May 2000

Stage 12
26 May 2000 — Bibione to Feltre,

Stage 13
27 May 2000 — Feltre to Sëlva,

Stage 14
28 May 2000 — Sëlva to Bormio,

Stage 15
29 May 2000 — Bormio to Brescia,

Stage 16
30 May 2000 — Brescia to Meda,

Stage 17
31 May 2000 — Meda to Genoa,

Stage 18
1 June 2000 — Genoa to Prato Nevoso,

Stage 19
2 June 2000 — Saluzzo to Briançon,

Stage 20
3 June 2000 — Briançon to Sestriere,  (ITT)

Stage 21
4 June 2000 — Turin to Milan,

References

2000 Giro d'Italia
Giro d'Italia stages